The Queen's York Rangers (1st American Regiment) (RCAC) is a Canadian Army Primary Reserve Royal Canadian Armoured Corps regiment based in Toronto and Aurora. The regiment is part of 4th Canadian Division's 32 Canadian Brigade Group. The regiment consists of one cavalry squadron (D Squadron), as well as the Headquarters and Training Squadron. The regimental family also includes The Queen's York Rangers Band (volunteer), along with two Royal Canadian Army Cadet corps and a Royal Canadian Air Cadet squadron. The unit mottos are  'remembering their glories in former days' and  'swift and bold'. Among its own members and those of other regiments, the unit is referred to as the Rangers. The name is abbreviated as QY Rang, and sometimes pronounced  .

Lineage

Pre-Confederation 
The Queen's York Rangers (1st American Regiment) (RCAC) trace their direct origins to Robert Rogers and his Rangers in 1756 during the French and Indian Wars.  Disbanded after seven years of hard service, Rogers reformed the Rangers in 1775 and they soon were carried on the British Army list as The Queen's Rangers, First American Regiment.  The Rangers were particularly distinguished under John Graves Simcoe in 1777 at the Battle of Brandywine and were shipped to New Brunswick at the end of the war in 1783.  When Simcoe was appointed as the first Lieutenant Governor of Upper Canada, he made a stop in New Brunswick and raised the Queen's Rangers again and brought them with him in 1793 to Upper Canada. The Rangers were stood down again in 1802 and became the York Militia.  They became active again during the War of 1812 and again during the Upper Canada Rebellion in 1837-38.

The York Rangers 

The York County Militia was reconstituted again on 14 September 1866 as the 12th "York Battalion of Infantry". It was redesignated as the 12th Battalion of Infantry or "York Rangers" on 10 May 1872, as the 12th Regiment "York Rangers" on 8 May 1900 and, following the Great War, as The York Rangers on 1 May 1920. On 15 December 1936, it was amalgamated with The Queen's Rangers (1st American Regiment) and redesignated The Queen's York Rangers (1st American Regiment) (MG). It was redesignated as the 2nd (Reserve) Battalion, The Queen's York Rangers (1st American Regiment) on 5 March 1942, as The Queen's York Rangers (1st American Regiment) (Reserve) on 15 September 1944, as The Queen's York Rangers (1st American Regiment) on 30 November 1945, as the 25th Armoured Regiment (Queen's York Rangers), RCAC on 19 June 1947, The Queen's York Rangers (1st American Regiment) (25th Armoured Regiment) on 4 February 1949, The Queen's York Rangers (1st American Regiment) (RCAC) on 19 May 1958, The Queen's York Rangers (RCAC) on 3 September 1985 and The Queen's York Rangers (1st American Regiment) (RCAC) on 12 November 2004.

The Queen's Rangers (1st American Regiment) 

The Queen's Rangers (1st American Regiment) was formed in Toronto, Ontario on 15 January 1921 as The West Toronto Regiment. On 1 August 1925, it was amalgamated with the 2nd Battalion (35th Battalion, CEF), The York Rangers and redesignated The Queen's Rangers. It was redesignated The Queen's Rangers (1st American Regiment) on 1 December 1927. On 15 December 1936, it was amalgamated with The York Rangers.

Lineage chart

Perpetuations

War of 1812 
The Queen's York Rangers (1st American Regiment) (RCAC) perpetuate the Battalion of Incorporated Militia of Upper Canada and the 1st and 3rd Regiments of York Militia.

The Great War 
The regiment perpetuates the 20th Battalion (Central Ontario), CEF, the 35th Battalion, CEF, 127th Battalion (12th York Rangers), CEF and the 220th Battalion (12th Regiment York Rangers), CEF.

Commanders

In 2011, the Minister of National Defence approved the ex officio honorary appointment of the Lieutenant Governor of Ontario as the unit's Colonel of the Regiment in perpetuity. The appointment recognizes the regiment’s links to John Graves Simcoe, the first Lieutenant Governor of Upper Canada and the regiment's commander during the American War of Independence.

Operational history

North-West Rebellion
The 12th Battalion of Infantry (York Rangers) mobilized four companies for active service on 10 April 1885. The companies served with the York and Simcoe Provisional Battalion in the Alberta Column of the North West Field Force. The companies were removed from active service on 24 July 1885.

First World War
The 20th Battalion (Central Ontario), CEF was authorized on 7 November 1914 and embarked for Britain on 15 May 1915. It disembarked in France on 15 September 1915, where it fought as part of the 4th Canadian Infantry Brigade, 2nd Canadian Division in France and Flanders until the end of the war.  For much of the war, the commanding officer of the battalion was Lieutenat-Colonel C.H. Rogers, a descendant of Robert Rogers.  The battalion performed particularly well at the Battle of the Somme, Vimy Ridge, Hill 70, Passchendaele, and at Amiens and Canal du Nord in 1918. Two of its members, Lieutenant Wallace Lloyd Algie and Sergeant Frederick Hobson, were posthumously awarded the Victoria Cross.

The 20th Battalion was disbanded on 30 August 1920.  Altogether, 4,310 officers and men had served in the battalion; 843 were killed in action or died of wounds (often having been wounded earlier) and 1,855 were wounded—often several times. Some 22 members of the battalion had been taken prisoner during the war with the largest haul being when nine were taken when evacuating casualties at Passchendaele.

The 35th Battalion, CEF was authorized on 7 November 1914 and embarked for Britain on 16 October 1915. The battalion was redesignated the 35th Reserve Battalion, CEF on 9 February 1915, and it provided reinforcements to the Canadian Corps in the field until 4 January 1917 when its personnel were absorbed by the 4th Reserve Battalion, CEF. The battalion was disbanded on 8 December 1917.

The 127th Battalion (12th York Rangers), CEF was authorized on 22 December 1915 and embarked for Britain on 21 August 1916. It provided reinforcements to the Canadian Corps in the field until 20 November 1916 when it was reorganized as a railway battalion. It disembarked in France on 13 January 1917, and was redesignated the 2nd Battalion, Canadian Railway Troops, CEF on 3 February 1917, where it provided special engineering services to the British Expeditionary Force in France and Flanders until the end of the war.

In April 1918 as the second great German offensive of the year rolled back over the old Somme Battlefield, the 127th was pressed into service as infantry near Amiens. Although initially trained as infantry, the battalion had not been employed as such but the men were apparently eager to show they could fight even if they were only armed with rifles. Combing through the chaos of Amiens, a large number of 'surplus' Lewis guns were 'acquired' and the battalion entered the line with considerably more firepower than might have been expected. At any rate, the German advance was being slowed up by exhausted troops and the usual logistical problems created in moving over World War I battlefields. The attempt to dislodge the 127th was not a determined one and the battalion's inordinate firepower debarred further attempts. The position they secured remained the Allied front line until the Amiens Offensive of 8 August 1918. Once relieved, the 127th returned to its previous duties. The battalion was disbanded on 23 October 1920.

The 220th Battalion (12th Regiment York Rangers), CEF was authorized on 15 July 1916 and embarked for Britain on 26 January 1917, where its personnel were absorbed by the 3rd Reserve Battalion, CEF on 7 May 1917 to provide reinforcements for the Canadian Corps in the field. The battalion was disbanded on 1 September 1917.

Second World War
Details from the regiment were called out on service on 26 August 1939 and placed on active service on 1 September 1939 for local protection duties until disbanded on 31 December 1940. The regiment subsequently mobilized the 1st Battalion, The Queen's York Rangers (1st American Regiment), CASF on 5 March 1942.40 It served in Canada in a home defence role as part of Military District No. 2, until disbanded on 15 October 1943.  Altogether, over 2,000 Rangers served in the Second World but those who went overseas did so in other regiments.

Battle honours

The following list are the battle honours awarded to the battalions perpetuated by the Rangers as well as to the Rangers themselves.  They are organized by the campaign. Battle honours in small capitals are for large operations and campaigns and those in lowercase are for more specific battles. Bold type indicates honours emblazoned on the regimental guidon.

Alliances
 - The Princess of Wales's Royal Regiment (Queen's and Royal Hampshires)
 - The Yorkshire Regiment (14th/15th, 19th and 33rd/76th Foot)

Order of precedence

Band

Since the 1970s, the regiment has maintained a volunteer fife and drums band. Over the years, the number of bandsmen were lowered until the unit was reduced to nil strength. The Streetsville Pipes and Drums were formed in 1986 and in 2009, made an arrangement with the regiment that they would adopt a second persona as the Regimental Band of The Queen’s York Rangers.

The Queen's York Rangers (1st American Regiment) (RCAC) Museum

The museum preserves and displays the history of The Queen’s York Rangers (1st American
Regiment) and its several predecessors for the benefit of both the members of the Regiment and the
public at large. The museum is affiliated with: CMA,  CHIN, OMMC and Virtual Museum of Canada.

Armouries

See also
 List of armouries in Canada
 United States Army Rangers

References

Further reading
 The Queen's York Rangers: An Historic Regiment by Stewart H. Bull (1984).
 The Queen's Rangers in the Revolutionary War by Colonel C.J. Ingles, D.S.O., V.D. (1956).
 Queen's Rangers: John Simcoe and his Rangers During the Revolutionary War for America by John Simcoe (1787).

External links

Regimental website

Queen's York Rangers (1st American Regiment)
Ranger regiments of Canada
Armoured regiments of Canada
Military units and formations of Ontario
British colonial regiments
Regimental museums in Canada
Infantry regiments of Canada in World War II